Gregory Grossman (July 5, 1921, Kiev – August 14, 2014) was late professor emeritus at UC Berkeley, an authority on the economy of the Soviet Union. He is credited with the introduction of the terms "second economy" and "command economy".

He received his undergraduate degree in economics from Berkeley in 1942 and his Ph.D. in economics from Harvard University in 1952. He spent his entire career, 1952–1993, at Berkeley.

He received the lifetime achievement award from the American Association for the Advancement of Slavic Studies in 1991.

The term "command economy" was introduced in his seminal 1963 article Notes for a Theory of the Command Economy. The term "second economy" was introduced in his another article, The Second Economy of the USSR (1977).

Publications
Grossman, G. 1963: Notes for a theory of the Command Economy. Soviet Studies XV(2): 101–123.
Grossman, G. 1977: The second economy of the USSR. Problems of Communism. September—October, reprinted. In: Tanzi, V (ed). The Underground Economy in the United States and Abroad. Lexington: Lexington, MA.

References

1921 births
2014 deaths
American economists
University of California, Berkeley College of Letters and Science faculty
University of California, Berkeley alumni
Harvard Graduate School of Arts and Sciences alumni
Soviet emigrants to the United States